Montroig may refer to:
 Mont-roig del Camp, Tarragona, Catalonia, Spain
 Mont-roig de Tastavins, Teruel, Aragon, Spain